Wola Aleksandra  is a village in the administrative district of Gmina Nieporęt, within Legionowo County, Masovian Voivodeship, in east-central Poland.

The village has a population of 136.

References

Wola Aleksandra